Popper and After: Four Modern Irrationalists is a book about irrationalism by the philosopher David Stove. First published by Pergamon Press in 1982, it has since been reprinted as Anything Goes: Origins of the Cult of Scientific Irrationalism and Scientific Irrationalism: Origins of a Postmodern Cult.

Part one

How Irrationalism About Science is Made Credible

Neutralizing Success-Words

Stove starts chapter one by clarifying the sort of view that would uncontroversially constitute an irrationalist position regarding science.

Stove then advances his reading of the philosophers he is criticising: "Popper, Kuhn, Lakatos, and Feyerabend, are all writers whose position inclines them to deny (A), or at least makes them more or less reluctant to admit it. (That the history of science is not "cumulative", is a point they all agree on)." Popper himself had given a 1963 summary of his thoughts the title "Conjectures and Refutations: The Growth of Scientific Knowledge", seemingly endorsing (A) in almost identical language. Nonetheless, the question Stove addresses in the chapter is "How do these writers manage to be plausible, while being reluctant to admit so well-known a truth as (A)?"

A general answer to this question is offered: "the constant tendency in these authors to conflate questions of fact with questions of logical value, or the history with the philosophy of science." Stove claims this tendency is "widely recognized", but waives both this general answer (and its supporters) in favour of seeking a more specific account.

Stove's first step in refining the general answer is observing what he calls mixed strategy writing in the authors he is examining. He uses this expression, since it is not always clear to him whether the writing expresses "equivocation" or "inconsistency". What is common to the examples Stove offers is that something well-known is mixed with something extraordinary, without the clash being resolved; the "irrationalism" is introduced simultaneously with orthodoxy, rendering it more plausible to the reader—disbelief is suspended.

A straightforward example is provided by Thomas Kuhn's description of "paradigm shift", where he asserts the well-known fact that the world is the same after "paradigm shift" as before.
Yet, at the same time, Kuhn also suggests that solutions to problems achieved under old paradigms are lost, redundant or "un-solutions" under new paradigms—denial of (A) above.

Examining Kuhn's use of the word solution more closely, Stove notes that Kuhn sometimes uses it in the ordinary way regarding practical knowledge, but at other times in a weaker sense, specific to Kuhn's theory, that a solution is relative to a paradigm, people, place and time. This equivocation on solution actually provides Stove with an answer of exactly the type he was looking for. All his authors, with many similar words, show similar equivocation. Stove lists knowledge, discovery, facts, verified, understanding, explanation and notes the list is far from complete. Idiosyncratic weak senses of these words are a characteristic of the writing of his subjects that explains clearly how a reader, presuming ordinary use of language, might believe them to be expressing something more orthodox than is, in fact, their intention.

At this point, Stove coins the expression neutralizing success words and provides an uncontroversial example from everyday language to illustrate it.

Stove also provides a quote from Paul Feyerabend (1975:27) explicitly directing his readers to "neutralize" his success words or not, according to their own preferences.

Sabotaging Logical Expressions

Chapter two begins with the following, precisely worded definition of logical expression.

Stove notes that logical expressions can be sabotaged, just as success-words can be neutralized. He spends some time clarifying the relationship between these phenomena, since they are similar in intention but not, in fact, identical. Rather, they work together in the following way.

He also articulates the distinction in an informal (and wittily expressed) way, that sabotaging logical expressions is like derailing cognitive achievement en route, so that it can never arrive anywhere; while neutralizing success-words is more like blowing up any cognitive achievement at the destination, so it can never be recognized as having arrived.

Stove now presents a common method of sabotaging logical expressions in a generalizable form.

This simple pattern of expression makes historical rather than logical assertions (like an encyclopedia documenting debate, without making any truth-claims about what is said, only that it was said, see de dicto and de re).
Example:
Eeyore: Kanga told me Winnie-the-Pooh said, "Pigs can fly."
Piglet: Well, do you believe it?
Eeyore: Yes I do, that's exactly the kind of thing Pooh would say. [de dicto] OR
Eeyore: I don't know, you tell me, you're a pig. [de re]
Knowledge about what people say is different to knowledge about the matters they discuss. Stove accuses his subjects of making statements about scientific discourse, when their readers expect statements about the science itself.

Part two

How irrationalism about science began

The historical source located

Stove notes that in part one he has only demonstrated how an irrational position might be expressed, in such a way as it had some appearance of credibility, not that such a position is actually held by the subjects of his study. He now turns to establishing this second point. The philosophers he is criticising not only use language in unusual ways, but do indeed also make plain language assertions of an irrationalist nature. Stove presents examples of what he believes are the clearest statements of irrationalism in their writing. Ultimately he considers providing examples from Karl Popper suffices. He presents the quotes and paraphrases apparently in ascending order of irrationality.
"There are no such things as good positive reasons."
"Positive reasons are neither necessary nor possible."
A scientific theory is, not only never certain, but never even probable, in relation to the evidence for it.
A scientific theory cannot be more probable, in relation to the empirical evidence for it, than it is a priori, or in the absence of all empirical evidence.
The truth of any scientific theory or law-statement is exactly as improbable, both a priori and in relation to any possible evidence, as the truth of a self-contradictory proposition.
"Belief, of course, is never rational: it is rational to suspend belief."
Stove seems to restrain his witticisms in the course of presenting the evidence above. However, as he presents the last quote, he appears to experience his astonishment at such a statement as though again for the first time, expressing this via his characteristically barbed wit. Not only could Popper bring himself to make the last assertion, he is sufficiently comfortable with it to supply of course. Not only does Popper consider belief to be irrational, he considers this to be common knowledge!

Returning to serious analysis, Stove next presents Popper's own explicit endorsement of David Hume's scepticism regarding induction.
"I agree with Hume's opinion that induction is invalid and in no sense justified."
"Are we rationally justified in reasoning from repeated instances of which we have experience to instances of which we have had no experience? Hume's unrelenting answer is: No, we are not justified. ... My own view is that Hume's answer to this problem is right."
This explains where many of Popper's ideas have come from—he shares Hume's scepticism about induction.

Stove considers this establishes what he set out to show in the chapter since, "Popper's philosophy of science is at any rate not more irrationalist than that of Feyerabend, Kuhn, or Lakatos, and at the same time, as a matter of well-known history, Popper's philosophy owes nothing to theirs, while Kuhn's philosophy owes much, and the philosophy of Lakatos and Feyerabend owes nearly everything, to Popper."

However, he explains that establishing both that these writers are irrationalists, and where their irrationalism comes from historically, still leaves the question of what it is they believe that leads them to accept this irrationalist conclusion. What implicit premise grounds their confidence in such an otherwise unattractive conclusion?

The key premise of irrationalism identified

In chapter four, Stove presents Hume's argument for scepticism about the unobserved (A in diagram and table below), quoting from three primary sources — A Treatise of Human Nature, An Abstract [of A Treatise of Human Nature] and An Enquiry concerning Human Understanding. He supports his reading by quotes from the secondary literature, where his interpretation of Hume might otherwise be challenged. He concludes that deductivism (O in diagram and table below) is the "key premise of irrationalism". In Stove's words, "Nothing fatal to empiricist philosophy of science ... follows from the admission that arguments from the observed to the unobserved are not the best; unless this assumption was combined, as it was with Hume, with the fatal assumption that only the best will do [emphasis original]." He concludes the chapter with the following diagram and table.

Further evidence for this identification

Having established that it is specifically deductivism that characterises his subjects, and leads them first to scepticism regarding induction and then to scepticism about any scientific theory, Stove now observes that deductivism is a thesis that of itself would incline a proponent towards language like that discussed in part one of Popper and After.

Stove provides examples and further evidence before finally turning to a brief, common-sense defense of scientific reasoning.

Stove modifies this argument to suit induction and concludes the book with some strong words regarding the climate of discourse in the philosophy of science current at the time of publication.

Reviews

See also

Australian realism
History and philosophy of science

Notes

Bibliography

David Charles Stove. Popper and After. Oxford: Pergamon Press, 1982.
David Charles Stove. Probability and Hume's Inductive Scepticism. Oxford: Clarendon Press, 1973.

External links
 The text of the book.
Relevant entries in the Stanford Encyclopedia of Philosophy:
Bird, Alexander. "Thomas Kuhn". August 2004.
Morris, William Edward. "David Hume". July 2007.
Preston, John. "Paul Feyerabend". February 2007.
Thornton, Stephen. "Karl Popper". October 2006.

Other links:

Gardner, Martin. "A Skeptical Look at Karl Popper". Skeptical Inquirer 25 (2001): 13–14.
Jan C. Lester: A Sceptical Look at "A Skeptical Look at Karl Popper" (Libertarian Alliance website, January 2004)
Kelley L. Ross: Criticism of Karl Popper in Martin Gardner's Are Universes Thicker Than Blackberries? (2003)
Panchen, Alec L. "Popper and After". In Classification, Evolution, and the Nature of Biology. Cambridge University Press, 1992. Pages 308ff.
Stove, David Charles. "Cole Porter and Karl Popper: The Jazz Age in the Philosophy of Science". In Anthony O'Hear (ed.). Karl Popper: Critical Assessments of Leading Philosophers. Routledge, 2004.
Windschuttle, Keith. The Killing of History. Sydney: Macleay Press, 1994.

1982 non-fiction books
Australian non-fiction books
Books about Karl Popper
Books by David Stove
Contemporary philosophical literature
English-language books
Philosophical realism
Philosophy of science literature
Pergamon Press books